Touring is a specialty card game originally designed by William Janson Roche and patented by the Wallie Dorr Company and produced in 1906. It was acquired by Parker Brothers in 1925.

It is widely believed the popular French card game Mille Bornes was derived from Touring. After several revisions, Touring was discontinued shortly after Parker Brothers picked up the American license of Mille Bornes. However, the game of Touring was reissued by Winning Moves in 2014.

Updates to editions
The original Wallie Dorr edition was a small red box with 100 cards. They updated the game to a side-by-side wider box which Parker Bros used for their first edition of the game after they purchased it.

Periodically the Parker Bros. Co. adjusted the card art and subsequently, the images became more modern, and increased the mileage cards. Until the final edition, game play remained unchanged, just the denominations of miles increased as the trip length and comfort of automobile travel increased. The final edition reversed the trend, using artwork closer to the original Model-T-era cars and adjusting the card totals with an addition of two new delays.

Original rules

The players run a race of 50 or 100 miles, as agreed before the game starts. A player cannot play the mileage cards (1, 3, 5, 10 Miles) unless they have a Go card in front of them. If both players are in City Limits (played by either), they can't play the 10 Mile card ("Speed Limit 5 Miles per Hour"); they can remove this card's effect by playing the Country! card (which affects both players). They lose 1 or 2 hours if an opponent plays a Collision ("Delay! 1 Hour"), Out of Gasoline ("Delay! 1 Hour"), or Puncture ("Delay! 2 Hours") card and must discard an "hour's" worth of cards for each hour (5 miles in the city, 10 miles in the country). To resume driving, they must also play a "Remedy" card (Hauled In for a collision and Gasoline for Out of Gasoline, nothing for Puncture) and a Go card. To win, the player must exactly match the total mileage (50 or 100 miles, as agreed).

Play variant
In each copy of the directions were an option to play progressive touring, in which multiple tables of 4 would play simultaneously.

Cards of select editions

Notes

Popular culture
 The members of They Might Be Giants can be seen playing Touring in the video for their song "Ana Ng".

Notes

See also
Mille Bornes

Card games introduced in 1906
Dedicated deck card games
Parker Brothers games